Guts is a retrospective compilation album by John Cale, released by Island Records in February 1977. It includes the songs "Leaving It Up To You", which was deleted from Helen of Troy, and the previously unreleased "Mary Lou". It was compiled by Howard Thompson.

The CD backcover has a misprint: "Guts" is listed as "Cute".

Track listing 
Side A
"Guts"
"Mary Lou"
"Helen of Troy"
"Pablo Picasso"
"Leaving It Up To You"

Side B
"Fear Is A Man's Best Friend"
"Gun"
"Dirty Ass Rock 'n' Roll"
"Heartbreak Hotel"

Personnel
 John Cale − vocals, keyboards, guitar, bass, percussion
 Chris Spedding − guitar
 Phil Manzanera − guitar
 Archie Leggatt − bass
 Pat Donaldson − bass
 Trevor Burton − bass
 Timi Donald − drums
 Fred Smith − drums
 Keith Smart − drums
 Phil Collins − drums
 Raymond Duffy − drums
 Tony Carr − percussion
 Andy Mackay − saxophone
 Brian Eno − synthesizer
 John Wood − synthesizer
 Geoff Muldaur − backing vocals
 Barry St. John − backing vocals
 Liza Strike − background vocals

References

Albums produced by John Cale
John Cale compilation albums
1977 compilation albums
Island Records compilation albums